Glenea ochreosignata is a species of beetle in the family Cerambycidae. It was described by Karl-Ernst Hüdepohl in 1995. It is known from Malaysia.

References

ochreosignata
Beetles described in 1995